Urticaria-like follicular mucinosis is a rare cutaneous disorder that occurs primarily in middle-aged men.

See also 
 Mucinosis
 List of cutaneous conditions

References 

Urticaria and angioedema